The Sinister Six are a group of supervillains in the Marvel Comics universe, drawn from Spider-Man's rogues gallery. There are several different formations of the group along the history of Marvel Comics' publications whose objectives vary from joining forces against Spider-Man or another common enemy to world domination mostly facing spider-man.

Membership

Founding members

Some later recruits

Sinister Six #5
This fifth incarnation was formed by the Sandman to get revenge on Doctor Octopus.

 Sandman (leader)
 Electro
 Kraven the Hunter (Alyosha Kravinoff)
 Mysterio (Daniel Berkhart)
 Venom (Eddie Brock)
 Vulture (Adrian Toomes)

Sinister Six #6 (Sinister Twelve)
This sixth incarnation was formed by Norman Osborn at the time when he was unmasked as the Green Goblin.

 Green Goblin (Norman Osborn, leader)
 Boomerang
 Chameleon
 Electro
 Hammerhead
 Hydro-Man
 Lizard
 Sandman
 Shocker
 Tombstone
 Venom (Mack Gargan)
 Vulture (Adrian Toomes)

Sinister Six #7
This seventh incarnation was formed during the Civil War storyline.
 
 Doctor Octopus (leader)
 Grim Reaper
 Lizard
 Shocker
 Trapster
 Vulture (Adrian Toomes)

Sinister Six #8
This eighth incarnation was formed following the Origin of the Species storyline and were the main antagonists of the Ends of the Earth storyline:

 Doctor Octopus (leader)
 Sandman
 Electro
 Mysterio (Quentin Beck)
 Chameleon
 Rhino

Sinister Six #9
This ninth incarnation debuted in the Marvel NOW! event. After their defeat by the Superior Spider-Man, who took the Living Brain to be his own assistant, the remaining five became the lead characters in Superior Foes of Spider-Man:

 Boomerang (leader)
 Beetle (Janice Lincoln)
 Living Brain
 Overdrive
 Shocker
 Speed Demon

Sinister Six #10 (Superior Six)
The Superior Spider-Man (Doctor Octopus' mind in Peter Parker's body) captures and assembles his own "superhero team" which he controls through tech implanted in the villains. This 10th incarnation debuted in Superior Spider-Man Team-Up #5 (2013). The roster corresponds closely to the original lineup.

 Spider-Man (Otto Octavius, leader)
 Electro
 Chameleon
 Mysterio
 Sandman
 Vulture (Adrian Toomes)

Sinister Six #11
In order to steal valuables from the Chameleon, Boomerang's Sinister Six (minus the Living Brain and the Shocker) ally themselves with the Owl, who hires 11 others to create the "Sinister Sixteen".

 Boomerang (leader)
 Owl (leader)
 Armadillo
 Beetle (Janice Lincoln)
 Bi-Beast
 Clown (half-brother of Eliot Franklin)
 Cyclone (Pierre Fresson)
 Human Fly (Richard Deacon)
 Kangaroo (Brian Hibbs)
 Man Mountain Marko
 Mirage (Desmond Charne)
 Overdrive
 Scorcher
 Shriek
 Speed Demon
 Spot
 Squid (Don Callahan)

Sinister Six #12
Mojo and the Chameleon abduct Spider-Man and his X-Men students, and force them to star in a show which pits them against the Sinister Sixty-Six. The group, which is not seen in its entirety, consists of holographic stand-ins of various enemies of Spider-Man.

 Beetle
 Carnage
 Demogoblin
 Doctor Octopus
 Electro
 Gibbon
 Green Goblin
 Grizzly
 Hammerhead
 Hobgoblin
 Jackal
 A Jack O'Lantern
 Kingpin
 Kraven the Hunter
 Lizard
 Morbius the Living Vampire (orb)
 Mysterio
 Puma
 Rhino
 Ringer
 Sandman
 Scorpion
 Shocker
 Tombstone
 Venom
 Vermin
 Vulture

Sinister Six #13
A new team is assembled by Swarm in Spider-Man and the X-Men. While stealing a delivery of gold, the group is confronted by Spider-Man and his X-Men students; after Swarm is defeated by Hellion, his teammates surrender.

 Swarm (leader)
 8-Ball 
 Delilah
 Killer Shrike (Simon Maddicks)
 Melter 
 Squid (Don Callahan)

Sinister Six #14
A new incarnation is assembled by Miles Morales' uncle Aaron Davis, who is wearing a re-colored and modified version of the Iron Spider armor.

 Iron Spider (Aaron Davis, leader)
 Bombshell (Lana Baumgartner)
 Electro (Francine Frye)
 Hobgoblin
 Sandman
 Spot

Sinister Six #15
In Friendly Neighborhood Spider-Man (vol. 2) #6, Spider-Man plays with Nathan, a cancer patient, where they envision that Nathan becomes Spider-Bite and they "fight" the Sinister Sixty who wish to obtain Spider-Bite's action figure of Spider-Man.

 Stilt-Man (leader)
 Absorbing Man
 Big Man (Frederick Foswell) 
 Black Cat
 Black Tarantula
 Boomerang
 Calypso
 Carrion
 Carnage
 Chameleon
 Demogoblin
 Doctor Octopus
 Doppelganger
 Electro
 Enforcers
 Fancy Dan
 Montana
 Ox
 Fusion
 Green Goblin
 Grey Goblin 
 Hammerhead
 Hobgoblin
 Hydro-Man
 Jack O'Lantern
 Jackal
 Joystick
 Juggernaut
 Kaine
 Kingpin
 Kraven the Hunter
 Kraven the Hunter II
 Kraven the Hunter III
 Lady Octopus
 Lizard
 Mephisto
 Mister Negative
 Molten Man
 Morbius, the Living Vampire
 Morlun
 Mysterio
 Raptor
 Rhino
 Sandman
 Sasha Kravinoff
 Scorpia
 Scorpion
 Scream
 Screwball
 Shocker
 Shriek
 Silvermane
 Sin-Eater
 Alistair Smythe
 Stunner
 Swarm
 Tarantula
 Tombstone
 Venom
 Vermin
 Vulture

Sinister Six #16 (Sinister War)
In Sinister War, six teams with 36 villains total are formed under the influence of Kindred and paired up in a contest to see who can take out Spider-Man first.

 Doctor Octopus (leader)
 Electro
 Kraven the Hunter - This version is a clone of Kraven the Hunter that was formerly known as the "Last Son of Kraven".
 Lizard - This version was separated from Curt Connors by the Isotope Genome Accelerator
 Mysterio
 Sandman

 Vulture (leader)
 King Cobra
 Rhino
 Scorpion
 Stegron
 Tarantula

 Beetle (leader)
 Electro II
 Lady Octopus
 Scorpia
 Trapstr
 White Rabbit
 Kraven the Hunter (Ana Kravinoff)

 Boomerang (leader)
 Hydro-Man (Replacing Beetle)
 Overdrive
 Shocker
 Speed Demon

 Foreigner (leader)
 Black Ant
 Chance
 Jack O'Lantern
 Slyde
 Taskmaster

 Sin-Eater (leader)
 Grey Gargoyle
 Juggernaut
 Living Laser
 Morlun
 Whirlwind

Other versions

Age of Apocalypse
In the Age of Apocalypse 10th anniversary limited series, Mister Sinister assembles his own group dubbed the Sinister Six to fight Magneto's X-Men. However, this group is unrelated to the more established lineup of criminals.

 Blob
 Cloak
 Dagger
 Phoenix
 Sauron
 Sonique

Avataars: Covenant of the Shield
On the planet Earth created by the Shaper of Worlds, the Sinister Six are known as the Six Most Sinister, a group of criminals operating a tollbooth in the Webwood who are led by the Goblin King. When the Champions of the Realm attempt to pass through the Webwoods, they are attacked by the Six Most Sinister, who they easily deal with and leave defeated as they move on.

 Tentaclus
 Jolt
 Huntsman
 Mysterium
 Sandstorm
 Talon

The Fist's 2099 A.D.
In an alternate reality in 2099 A.D., where the Fist – a splinter group of The Hand – succeeded in destroying the country, the Sinister Six have taken over Alchemex and rule the dystopian New York. Their leader, the Goblin, however, is secretly an informant working for the resistance. After being discovered, she is killed by Doctor Octopus, and instead find a new leader in Venture, who now employs them with the Fist, in the past.

 Venture (Qweeg)
 Venom (Kron Stone)
 Doctor Octopus (an unnamed Atlantean scientist)
 Vulture (Snidely)
 Electro (an android)
 Sandwoman
 Goblin (Jennifer D'Angelo) (former leader, mole; deceased)

Gentleman's Sinister Six
In a trilogy of Spider-Man novels written by Adam-Troy Castro, a criminal mastermind calling himself the Gentleman formed a Sinister Six as part of an elaborate scheme to claim vengeance on Spider-Man.

 Chameleon
 Doctor Octopus
 Electro
 Mysterio (Quentin Beck)
 Pity (the Gentleman's bodyguard (and possibly Peter Parker's long-lost sister))
 Vulture (Adrian Toomes)

Marvel Universe: Millennial Visions
Millennial Visions brings a brand-new look at the entire Marvel Universe, including a Noxious Nine that was formed after the members of the Sinister Six joined with Rhino, Scorpion and Carnage in order to take out the Blin Quay Nuclear Power Station. Carnage was atomized in a containment field that caused an overload, releasing high levels of radiation and fusing the genetic material of the remaining members to their costumes, greatly increasing their power and making them more animal than men.

 Doctor Octopus
 Vulture
 Lizard
 Rhino
 Scorpion
 Frog-Man
 Carnage (Atomized)
 Electro (Deceased)
 Mysterio (Deceased)
 Sandman (Deceased)

Marvel Zombies
A zombified version of the Sinister Six appears in Marvel Zombies: Dead Days. They are seen attacking innocent civilians upon the S.H.I.E.L.D. helicarrier, but are repelled by Wolverine and Magneto.

 Doctor Octopus
 Electro
 Green Goblin
 Mysterio
 Sandman
 Vulture (Adrian Toomes)

Marvel Zombies Return
In the Marvel Zombies series, the Sinister Six appear in an alternative universe that Zombie Spider-Man enters, working for the Kingpin. They are quickly and violently ripped apart, bitten, and zombified (except the Sandman, who hopefully flees by turning into sand and disguising himself as the dirt Zombie Spider-Man stood on), and end up eating Spider-Man's friends, which causes them to be killed in retaliation.

 Doctor Octopus
 Electro
 Kraven the Hunter
 Mysterio
 Sandman
 Vulture (Adrian Toomes)

Secret Invasion
Several variants of the Super-Skrull appear, including a Sinister Six Skrull with the combined powers of Sandman (William Baker), Hydro-Man (Morris Bench), Rhino (Aleksei Sytsevich), Electro (Maxwell Dillon), Venom (MacDonald Gargan), and Lizard (Curtis Connors).

Secret Wars (2015)
Various versions of the Sinister Six appear over various domains of Battleworld.

Spider-Verse
 Doctor Octopus
 Scorpion
 Kraven the Hunter
 Electro
 Sandman
 Vulture

Amazing Spider-Man: Renew Your Vows
 Doctor Octopus
 Hobgoblin
 Kraven the Hunter
 Mysterio
 Shocker
 Vulture
 Beetle (replacement member)
 Boomerang (replacement member)
 Rhino (replacement member)

Spider-Man's Shadow
After Peter Parker (Spider-Man) is consumed by the Venom symbiote, he goes on a killing spree, eliminating his rogues gallery one by one. J. Jonah Jameson begrudgingly calls upon Doctor Octopus to bring together the Sinister Six and combat the spider menace.

 J. Jonah Jameson (using a Spider-Slayer suit) (leader)
 Doctor Octopus (killed by Eddie Brock)
 Electro
 Mysterio 
 Kraven The Hunter
 Rhino
 Eddie Brock (using Doc Ock's metallic arms after killing him)

The Sinister Syndicate
Formed by the super-villain Abner Jenkins, aka "The Beetle" to act as a mercenary group that worked for the highest bidder. The group later reformed as the Deadly Foes of Spider-Man, before tearing themselves apart with in-fighting. When Boomerang became the leader of the Sinister Six, the Shocker suggested going back to the name "Sinister Syndicate", but the idea was shot down by Speed Demon, objecting, "the Sinister Syndicate were losers!"

 Beetle (Abner Jenkins)
 Hydro-Man (Morris Bench)
 Rhino (Aleksei Sytsevich)
 Boomerang (Frederick Myers)
 Speed Demon (James Sanders)
 Shocker (Herman Schultz)
 Leila Davis (mole)

The Sinner Six
An elderly version of the Sinister Six, dubbed the Sinner Six, appeared in Spider-Man: Reign. This version of the team is forced into the employ of New York's fascist Mayor Waters via microchips placed inside them that would detonate if they attempted to leave the city. If they succeeded in killing Spider-Man, they would be given their freedom. When the enraged (and elderly) Spider-Man returned to the superhero game, he seemingly killed the Scorpion by throwing him out of a window and Hydro-Man and Electro by throwing them into each other, as well as badly beating Kraven and Mysterio, before the Sandman revealed the existence of the bombs and handed a detonator to Spider-Man, sacrificing himself to stop Mayor Waters' plans after Waters was revealed to be nothing more than a pawn of his aide, Eddie Brock.

 Electro
 Hydro-Man
 Kraven the Hunter
 Mysterio
 Sandman
 Scorpion

Spider-Verse
A version of the Sinister Six names the Six Men of Sinestry appears in Spider-Verse in the dimension of Earth-803 where it is set in Industrial Age New York. Their objective was to steal the mayor's plan. They battled Lady Spider and were forced to retreat after they were overwhelmed, yet they were able to accomplish their task.

 Green Goblin (Lord Norman Osborne)
 Doctor Octopus (Otto Octavius)
 Electro (Max Dillon)
 Kraven the Hunter (Sergei Kravinoff)
 Mysterio (Quentin Beck)
 Vulture (Adrian Toomes)

The Ultimate Six
In the Ultimate Marvel Universe, the Sinister Six is renamed the Ultimate Six. The original five villainous members initially attempted to recruit Spider-Man as the sixth member, but failed to do so. The Vulture would later join the team.

 Green Goblin (leader)
 Doctor Octopus
 Electro
 Kraven the Hunter
 Sandman
 Vulture

Web-Warriors
The Sinister Sextet of Earth-311 is founded by the dimension's version of Carnage.

 Carnage
 Electro
 Hobgoblin
 Kraven
 Mysterio
 Lizard

Television
Former members and replacements listed last

Spider-Man: The Animated Series
A version of the Sinister Six appeared in Spider-Man: The Animated Series, renamed the Insidious Six. This incarnation was formed by the Kingpin.

 Doctor Octopus (Otto Octavius, leader)
 Scorpion (Mac Gargan)
 Rhino
 Shocker
 Chameleon
 Mysterio (Quentin Beck, former member, deceased)
 Vulture (Adrian Toomes, replacing Mysterio)

The Spectacular Spider-Man
The Sinister Six appears in the Spectacular Spider-Man animated series, a group of supervillains led and formed by Doctor Octopus in order to physically beat Spider-Man.

 Doctor Octopus/Master Planner (Otto Octavius, leader)
 Electro (Max Dillon)
 Rhino (Alexander O'Hirn)
 Sandman (Flint Marko)
 Vulture (Adrian Toomes)
 Shocker/Montana (Jackson Brice, former members)
 Mysterio (Quentin Beck, replacing the Shocker)
 Kraven the Hunter (Sergei Kravinoff, substituting in the field for Doctor Octopus)

Ultimate Spider-Man
The Sinister Six (later, the "Sinister Seven" and the "Superior Sinister Six") appear in the Ultimate Spider-Man animated series, led by Doctor Octopus. Unlike in the comic book series of the same name, the team is known as the Sinister Six rather than the Ultimate Six.

 Doctor Octopus (leader) (I, II, III, IV)
 Kraven the Hunter (I, II, III, IV)
 Rhino (I, II, III, IV)
 Electro (I, II, III)
 Lizard (Curt Connors) (I, II)
 Beetle (I)
 Scorpion (II, IV)
 Ultimate Green Goblin (III)
 Hydro-Man (III) 
 Scarlet Spider (III)
 Vulture (IV)
 Crossbones (Lizard form) (IV)

Marvel's Spider-Man
The Sinister Six appear in the 2017 Spider-Man animated series, led by Doctor Octopus. At first, the group is formed by Norman Osborn as the Osborn Commandos until Octopus takes over. Unlike other incarnations, this team is known as the "Sinister Five" until Octopus brainwashes Spider-Man into being their sixth member.

 Doctor Octopus (leader)
 Vulture (mind controlled)
 Rhino (mind controlled)
 Alistair Smythe (mind controlled)
 Steel Spider (mind controlled)
 Spider-Man (mind controlled)

Video games

The Amazing Spider-Man
The game does not explicitly identify the game's antagonists as the Sinister Six, though all six of them have been members of the team in other media.
Mysterio
Hobgoblin
Scorpion
Rhino
Doctor Octopus
Venom

Spider-Man: Return of the Sinister Six
In the NES game Spider-Man: Return of the Sinister Six, the Sinister Six is featured with the same line-up as the story arc the game is named for.

 Doctor Octopus (leader)
 Electro
 Hobgoblin (Jason Macendale)
 Mysterio
 Sandman
 Vulture

Spider-Man 2: The Sinister Six
The Sinister Six are the primary enemies of the video game Spider-Man 2: The Sinister Six.

 Doctor Octopus (leader)
 Kraven the Hunter
 Mysterio
 Sandman
 Scorpion
 Vulture

Spider-Man Vs. The Sinister Six
The Sinister Six are the main antagonists in the DOS video game Spider-Man Vs. The Sinister Six.

 Chameleon
 Doctor Octopus
 Hobgoblin
 Mysterio
 Vulture
 Shocker

Spider-Man: Shattered Dimensions
The team went by The Ultimate Six, Norman Osborn's Six, and simply The Six.

 Green Goblin (Norman Osborn) (leader)
 Electro (Maxwell Dillon)
 Spider-Man (Peter Parker)

Spider-Man: Edge of Time
 Doctor Octopus (Otto Octavius)  (leader)
 Kraven (Sergei Kravinoff)
 Mysterio (Quentin Beck)
 Sandman (William Baker)
 Electro (Max Dillon) (retired)
 Green Goblin (Norman Osborn) (retired)
 Vulture (Adrian Toomes) (retired)

Marvel: Avengers Alliance
The Sinister Six made their in-game debut as group during the level "Special Operations - Along Came the Spiders".

 Doctor Octopus (leader)
 Electro
 Kraven the Hunter
 Lizard
 Mysterio (Quentin Beck)
 Vulture (Adrian Toomes)
 Beetle (Janice Lincoln)

Marvel Super Hero Squad Online
Marvel Super Hero Squad Online was an MMO and card collecting game featurng the Sinister Six as the Sinister Syndicate.

 Dr. Octopus (Otto Octavius)
 Green Goblin (Norman Osborn)
 Kingpin (Wilson Fisk)
 Electro (Max Dillon)
 Lizard (Curtis Connors)
 Mysterio (Quentin Beck)
 Sandman (William Baker)
 Venom
 Carnage (Cletus Kasady)

Marvel Contest of Champions
 Doctor Octopus
 Vulture
 Green Goblin
 Iron Patriot
 Venom (former members)
 Mysterio (replacing Venom)
 Electro
 Rhino
 Kraven The Hunter

Spider-Man Unlimited
A Multiverse Sinister Six, consisting of various members of themselves, invade dimensions to harvest the mineral ISO-8.  They command an army of Sinister Soldiers.  During updates, various villains appear, either aiding them or just joining in the battles, such as Jack O' Lantern, Hydro-Man, Silver Sable and Demogoblin.

Goblins
 Green Goblin (Norman Osborn)
 Gold Goblin (Norman Osborn)
 Grey Goblin (Gabriel Stacy)
 Menace (male version)
 House of M Goblin (Peter Parker)
 Green Gobbler (Norman Osbird)

Vultures
 Vulture (Adrian Toomes)
 Classic Vulture (Adrian Toomes)
 Ultimate Vulture (Blackie Drago)
 Red Vulture (Adrian Toomes)
 Dark Vulture (Adrian Toomes)

Electros
 Electro (Max Dillon)
 Ultimate Electro (Max Dillon)
 Modern Electro (Max Dillon)
 Pure Energy Electro (Max Dillon)
 Classic Electro (Max Dillon)

Sandmen
 Sandman (William Baker)
 Sandman Noir (Flint Marko)
 Classic Sandman (William Baker/"Flint Marko")
 Dark Sandman (William Baker)
 Pure Sand Sandman (William Baker)

Doctor Octopuses
 Doctor Octopus (Otto Octavius)
 Classic Doctor Octopus (Otto Octavius)
 Chapter One Doctor Octopus (Otto Octavius)
 Ultimate Doctor Octopus (Otto Octavius)
 Doctor Octopus Noir (Otto Octavius)

Mysterios
 Mysterio (Quentin Beck)
 Classic Mysterio (Quentin Beck)
 Mysterion
 Superior Mysterion
 Dark Mysterio (Quentin Beck)

Marvel: Future Fight
A special mission features the Sinister Six in collaboration with A.I.M. This version, however, is led by Mysterio, who disguised himself as Doctor Octopus and tricks the other members as well as A.I.M. to take control of the group and the A.I.M. faction in New York. It is unknown if the Vulture is an official member, but he assists the other villains against their fight with Spider-Man and his allies.electro does get the team tag so he was added though rhino is in the event but doesn’t have the tag for some reason

 Mysterio (leader, disguised as Doctor Octopus)
 Lizard
 Kraven the Hunter
 Sandman
 Rhino
 Vulture (Adrian Toomes)
 Electro (Maxwell Dillon)

Marvel's Spider-Man
This team was formed by Otto Octavius, after he loses control of himself due to the dysfunctional AI in his tentacles influencing him and his darkest thoughts. He breaks out Martin Li and other villains Spider-Man has defeated and put in jail, offering them their personal desires and outfitting them with gear in exchange for their help to get revenge on and expose Mayor Norman Osborn and his involvement in the creation of Devil's Breath.

 Doctor Octopus (Otto Octavius, leader)
 Mister Negative (Martin Li, second-in-command)
 Electro (Max Dillon)
 Vulture (Adrian Toomes)
 Rhino (Alexsei Sytsevich)
 Scorpion (Mac Gargan)

Marvel Ultimate Alliance 3: The Black Order
Although never officially stated, it is believed to contain the version of The Sinister Six in this game:

 Green Goblin (Norman Osborn, leader)
 Doctor Octopus (Otto Octavius, second-in-command)
 Venom (Eddie Brock) (former member)
 Sandman (Flint Marko)
 Electro (Max Dillon)
 Mysterio (Quentin Beck)

Marvel Strike Force
 Doctor Octopus (leader)
 Green Goblin
 Mysterio
 Rhino
 Shocker
 Vulture
 Electro (Francine Frye)
 Swarm

Live-action

The Amazing Adventures of Spider-Man
The Sinister Six appear as the Sinister Syndicate appears in the theme park attraction The Amazing Adventures of Spider-Man. The group has captured the Statue of Liberty with an anti-gravity gun, and attack the guests.

 Doc Ock (Otto Octavius)
 Electro (Maxwell Dillon)
 Hobgoblin (Edward Leeds)
 Hydro-Man (Morris Bench)
 Scream (Donna Diego)

Spider-Man: Turn Off the Dark
The Sinister Six appears in the musical Spider-Man: Turn Off the Dark. In this version, their comic book origins are ignored. Instead, they share a common origin as former research scientists whom the Green Goblin deliberately mutates into "freaks" as punishment for having abandoned Osborn Industries.

 Carnage
 Electro
 Kraven the Hunter
 Lizard
 Swarm
 Swiss Miss

Marvel Universe Live!
 Green Goblin (Norman Osborn, leader)
 Doctor Octopus (Otto Octavius, second-in-command)
 Rhino (Aleksei Sytsevich)
 Black Cat (Felicia Hardy)
 Electro (Maxwell "Max" Dillon)
 Lizard (Dr. Curtis Connors)

Audio

Marvel's Squirrel Girl: The Unbeatable Radio Show! 
The Sinister Six became the Frightful Five after Kraven the Hunter was fired from the group after trying to quit it. Kraven befriended Squirrel Girl who convinced him to turn good; he moved to the Savage Land to protect dinosaurs from poachers. The Shocker stole some Pym Particles and was set to style himself as "The Giant Sized Shocker" before being talked down and inspired to do good by Squirrel Girl on her podcast, encouraging him to use his powers to turn turbines and generate clean and affordable electricity, making more money than bank robberies, and being a hero. The Scorpion has the ability to talk to scorpions.
 The Vulture (Adrian)
 Sandman
 Electro
 The Scorpion (Mac)
 Kraven the Hunter (former)
 The Shocker (Herman) (former)

References

Sinister Six